Mount Pisgah is a peak in Carbon County, Pennsylvania situated north-northwest from and looming over the right bank business district in downtown Jim Thorpe.

Location 
Mount Pisgah is located above Jim Thorpe and is the northeastern end of the 12.5-mile-long Pisgah Mountain (or Pisgah Ridge) above the Lehigh Valley. The peak is located in northeastern Pennsylvania's Anthracite Upland region on the west bank of the Lehigh River just north of and parallel to Broadway, which is a block downhill from the lower looping end of the historic Lehigh Coal & Navigation Company's historic Mauch Chunk & Summit Hill Railway, which delivered coal to barges through chutes crossing what is now U.S. Route 209 and the rail yard along the Lehigh.
 
While the lower south slope of the mountain and the ends of the railroad loop and yard have now been developed into private lots and a town street, there are still two railway rights-of-ways—railroad bed road ends now turned into bike & hiking trails to travel the  trip to the upper terminus and loop at Summit Hill, Pennsylvania.

Name 
Mt. Pisgah is named for the biblical mountain in Jordan from which Moses first saw the promised land.

References

 Alan R. Geyer (1979) "Outstanding Geologic Features of Pennsylvania", Geological Survey of Pennsylvania
 Tom Thwaites (1997) "50 hikes in Eastern Pennsylvania", Third edition
 Art Michaels (2003) "Pennsylvania Overlooks a guide for Sightseers and Outdoor People", Penn State Press

Mountains of Pennsylvania
Landforms of Carbon County, Pennsylvania